Complement component 9 (C9) is a MACPF protein involved in the complement system, which is part of the innate immune system. Once activated, about 12-18 molecules of C9 polymerize to form pores in target cell membranes, causing lysis and cell death. C9 is one member of the complement membrane attack complex (MAC), which also includes complement components C5b, C6, C7 and C8.  The formation of the MAC occurs through three distinct pathways: the classical, alternative, and lectin pathways. Pore formation by C9 is an important way that bacterial cells are killed during an infection, and the target cell is often covered in multiple MACs. The clinical impact of a deficiency in C9 is an infection with the gram-negative bacterium Neisseria meningitidis.

Structure 
C9 genes include 11 exons and 10 introns when found in fish. In fish, the liver is the site where the majority of complement components are produced and expressed, but C9 can also be found in other tissues. It is a single-chain glycoprotein with a four domain structure arranged in a globular bundle.

Pore formation 
MAC formation starts with the assembly of a tetrameric complex with the complement components C6, C7, C8, and C5b. The final step of MAC on target cell surfaces involves the polymerization of C9 molecules bound to C5b8 forming C5b-9. C9 molecules allow cylindrical, asymmetrical transmembrane pores to form. The overall complex belongs to MAC/perforin-like (MACPF)/CDC superfamily. Pore formation involves binding the C9 molecules to the target membrane, membrane molecules forming a pre-pore shape, and conformational change in the TMH1, the first transmembrane region, and TMH2, the second transmembrane region. The formations of pores leads to the killing of foreign pathogens and infected host cells.

Relation to aging process 
C9 was found to be the most strongly under expressed serum protein in men who achieved longevity, compared to men who did not.

References

External links 
 
 PDBe-KB provides an overview of all the structure information available in the PDB for Human Complement component C9 

Complement system